Malta competed at the 1948 Summer Olympics in London, England. This was their third Summer Olympics, and only sent one competitor.

Athletics

Key
Note–Ranks given for track events are within the athlete's heat only

Men
Track & road events

References
Official Olympic Reports

Nations at the 1948 Summer Olympics
1948 Summer Olympics
1948 in Maltese sport